Qu Jingyu (born October 16, 1986 in Qiqihar, Heilongjiang) is an Olympic swimmer from China. He swam for China at the 2008 Olympics.

He also swam for China at the 2007 World Championships.

Major achievements
2003 National Intercity Games - 2nd 200 m free;
2003 World Military Games - 2nd 400 m IM;
2003 National Short-Course Championships - 1st 100 m/200 m IM, 100 m breast;
2004 National Champions Tournament - 3rd 200 m free;
2005 National Games - 1st 200 m IM

Records
2003 National Short-Course Championships - 1:57.58, 200 m IM (NR)

References

http://2008teamchina.olympic.cn/index.php/personview/personsen/1286

1986 births
Living people
Chinese male freestyle swimmers
Olympic swimmers of China
Sportspeople from Qiqihar
Swimmers at the 2008 Summer Olympics
Swimmers from Heilongjiang
Asian Games medalists in swimming
Swimmers at the 2006 Asian Games
Asian Games silver medalists for China
Medalists at the 2006 Asian Games
Chinese male medley swimmers
Chinese male breaststroke swimmers
20th-century Chinese people
21st-century Chinese people